The Rangiya–New Tinsukia Express is an Express train belonging to Northeast Frontier Railway zone that runs between  and  in India. It is currently being operated with 15927/15928 train numbers on a six days in a weekly basis.

Service

The 15927/Rangiya–New Tinsukia Express has an average speed of 42 km/hr and covers 596 km in 14h 15m. The 15928/New Tinsukia–Rangiya Express has an average speed of 43 km/hr and covers 596 km in 14h.

Route and halts 

The important halts of the train are:

Coach composition

The train has standard ICF rakes with a max speed of 110 kmph. The train consists of 16 coaches:

 2 Second Sitting
 12 General Unreserved
 2 Seating cum Luggage Rake

Traction

Both trains are hauled by a Guwahati Loco Shed-based WDM-3A diesel locomotive from Rangiya to Tinsukia, and vice versa.

See also 

 Rangiya Junction railway station
 New Tinsukia Junction railway station
 Rangiya–Dibrugarh Express

Notes

References

External links 

 15927/Rangiya - New Tinsukia Express
 15928/New Tinsukia - Rangiya Express

Transport in Rangiya
Transport in Tinsukia
Express trains in India
Rail transport in Assam
Rail transport in Nagaland
Railway services introduced in 2010